This is a list of Scottish football transfers featuring at least one 2016–17 Scottish Premiership club or one 2016–17 Scottish Championship club which were completed after the summer 2016 transfer window closed and before the end of the 2016–17 season.

List

See also
 List of Scottish football transfers summer 2016
 List of Scottish football transfers summer 2017

References

External links
January transfer window: Scottish Premiership comings and goings, BBC Sport

Transfers
Scottish
2016 in Scottish sport
2017 in Scottish sport
2016 winter